Delena Kidd (born 11 February 1935) is an English actress who has appeared in numerous British television productions since the late 1950s. In recent years she is perhaps best known for her portrayal of Queen Adelaide in Victoria & Albert.

Biography
Her father was a doctor and her mother the actress Violet Ormonde. She attended Cheltenham Ladies' College, followed by the Central School of Speech and Drama where she won the Sybil Thorndike Prize. She then appeared in repertory theatre in Britain.

Career
Her television appearances include; The Four Just Men, Family Affairs, Time Trumpet, The Sweeney, The Two Mrs. Grenvilles and most recently Holby City in 2013.
Her films include Room at the Top.

Personal life
She is married to the actor Gary Raymond. The couple met on a production at the Oxford Playhouse and 56 years later they again appeared on stage together in Oxford at the Burton Taylor Studio.

Filmography

Film

Television

References

External links

1935 births
Living people
English film actresses
English television actresses
Alumni of the Royal Central School of Speech and Drama
People educated at Cheltenham Ladies' College